The 2016–17 National League A season was the tenth ice hockey season of Switzerland's top hockey league, the National League A. Overall, it was the 79th season of Swiss professional hockey.

SC Bern went on to win its 15th NLA title as the defending champions by defeating EV Zug. It was the first time since the 2000–01 season when the defending champions (ZSC Lions) won back-to-back titles.

Teams

Coaching changes
On September 22, 2016, Fribourg-Gottéron's Gerd Zenhäusern was relieved of his duties of head coach after posting a 1-1-1-3 record through 6 games this season. It was later announced that Larry Huras would take over the job for the remainder of the season.

On October 1, 2016, the SCL Tigers fired head coach Scott Beattie after posting a 1-0-2-7 record through 10 games this season. He eventually went on to coach his final game that same day against EHC Kloten, which Langnau won 5-3. On October 2, 2016, it was announced that Heinz Ehlers would be Langnau's new head coach for the remainder of the season and through the 2017–18 season should the team stay in the NLA.

On November 14, 2016, EHC Biel fired head coach Kevin Schlaepfer after posting an 8-0-2-11 record through 21 games this season. Mike McNamara who was coaching Biel junior team at the time, became the interim head coach for the main club.

On January 16, 2017, HC Lugano fired head coach Doug Shedden and assistant coach Pat Curcio after posting a 14-4-3-19 record through 40 games this season. It was later announced that Greg Ireland would replace Shedden at the helm of the team for the end of the season.

On January 30, 2017, HC Ambrì-Piotta parted ways with head coach Hans Kossmann after posting a 7-8-4-24 record through 43 games this season, sitting dead last in the NLA at the time. Gordie Dwyer will coach the team for the remainder of the season.

Arenas
Lausanne played its final season at Malley before playing two seasons in a temporary arena which will be located in the old city's slaughterhouse. Meanwhile, their new 10,000-seat arena will be built on the site of the old Malley.

This was Fribourg's last season in the current BCF Arena before it undergoes major renovations in the spring of 2017, which will last for about two years and increase the capacity from 6,500 to 8,500. The team should still be able to play in the arena during the renovations.

Regular season

Player statistics

Regular season

Playoffs

Playoffs

References

External links
 
 

1
Swiss
National League (ice hockey) seasons